Pseudoalteromonas lipolytica is a marine bacterium which was isolated from the Yangtze River.

References

External links
 
Type strain of Pseudoalteromonas lipolytica at BacDive -  the Bacterial Diversity Metadatabase

Alteromonadales